Giles Clark is an English conservationist and TV presenter.

Clark, who grew up in Middlesex, started his career working with big cats when volunteering as a sixteen-year-old. Moving to Australia, he became Head of Big Cats at Australia Zoo in Queensland. Upon returning to the UK he became a Director at The Big Cat Sanctuary in Kent.

His TV breakthrough came in 2014 when he presented the BBC programme Tigers About the House. The show, which consisted of three episodes, followed Giles and his family as they bring up two young tiger cubs. This was followed up with another series, a two-parter entitled Tigers About the House: What Happened Next. In 2016 he co-presented the four episodes of Ingenious Animals, another BBC programme. In 2018 he presented Big Cats About the House, which featured him bringing up a Jaguar called Maya and a Cheetah in his own home with his family.

In July 2020, Clark presented the BBC's programme Bears About the House, narrated by Andrew Lincoln. The series highlighted the illegal trade in sun bears and moon bears in Laos.  The first episode focuses on a sun bear called Mary whom Clark helps raise after she was rescued by Free the Bears Fund. The second episodes continued to follow the bears as they were rehabilitated.

In 2020 Clark was involved in setting up a new state of the art tiger enclosure and announced plans for a new exhibit for Sun Bears.

References

Living people
British television presenters
People from Middlesex
British conservationists
Year of birth missing (living people)